Nasiriyah District is a district of the Dhi Qar Governorate in Iraq.

Districts of Dhi Qar Province